Held since 1976, the annual U.S. National Table Tennis Championships (often referred to as the U.S. Closed) is a closed tournament that only U.S. citizens may enter. It is held by USA Table Tennis (USATT). The U.S. Nationals also serves as a qualifying tournament for USA Table Tennis National Team Trials and determines the USA Table Tennis Cadet and Juniors teams.  This tournament is traditionally held in Las Vegas, NV.

List of champions

Footnotes

External links
US Open Champions
US National Champions

Table tennis competitions
Table tennis competitions in the United States